Toobal is a surname of Estonian origin, and may refer to:
Andres Toobal (born 1988), Estonian volleyball player
Kert Toobal (born 1979), Estonian volleyball player
Priit Toobal (born 1983), Estonian politician

Estonian-language surnames